24 teams competed in the 2002 FIVB Volleyball Men's World Championship, with two places allocated for the hosts, Argentina and the titleholder, Italy. In the qualification process for the 2002 FIVB World Championship, the Five FIVB confederations were allocated a share of the 22 remaining spots.

Confederation qualification processes
The distribution by confederation for the 2002 FIVB Volleyball Men's World Championship was:

 Asia and Oceania (AVC): 5 places
 Africa (CAVB): 2 places
 Europe (CEV): 10 places (+ Italy qualified automatically as the defending champions for a total of 11 places)
 South America (CSV) 1.5 places (+ Argentina qualified automatically as host nation for a total of 2.5 places)
 North America (NORCECA): 3.5 places

Africa
10 national teams entered qualification. (South Africa and Ghana later withdrew) The teams were distributed according to their position in the FIVB Senior Men's Rankings. Teams ranked 1–6 automatically qualified for the second round.

Sub Pool A
Venue:  Benin City, Nigeria
Dates: January 28–30, 2001

|}

|}

Pool A
Venue:  Cairo, Egypt
Dates: August 10–12, 2001

|}

|}

Pool B
Venue:  Algiers, Algeria
Dates: August 9–11, 2001

|}

|}

Asia and Oceania
12 national teams entered qualification.

Pool C
Venue:  Almaty, Kazakhstan
Dates: August 3–5, 2001

|}

|}

Pool D
Venue:  Doha, Qatar
Dates: August 10–12, 2001

|}

|}

Pool E
Venue:  Macau
Dates: August 28–30, 2001

|}

|}

Second placed teams

|}

Europe
28 national teams entered qualification.

Pool F
Venue:  Seville, Spain
Dates: July 12–14, 2001

|}

|}

Pool G
Venue:  's-Hertogenbosch, Netherlands
Dates: June 24–26, 2001

|}

|}

Pool H
Venue:  Ostrava, Czech Republic
Dates: June 22–24, 2001

|}

|}

Pool I
Venue:  Łódź, Poland
Dates: August 31 – September 2, 2001

|}

|}

Pool J
Venue:  Prešov, Slovakia
Dates: August 24–26, 2001

|}

|}

Pool K
Venue:  Tampere, Finland
Dates: August 17–19, 2001

|}

|}

Pool L
Venue:  Bursa, Turkey
Dates: July 6–8, 2001

|}

|}

Second placed teams

|}

North America
10 national teams entered qualification. The teams were distributed according to their position in the FIVB Senior Men's Rankings. Teams ranked 1–6 automatically qualified for the second round.

Sub Pool B
Venue:  Oranjestad, Aruba
Dates: June 13–17, 2001

|}

|}

Pool M
Venue:  Havana, Cuba
Dates: July 27–29, 2001

|}

|}

Pool N
Venue:  Winnipeg, Canada
Dates: July 26–28, 2001

|}

|}

Second placed teams

|}

South America
4 national teams entered qualification but Peru later withdrew.

Pool O
Venue:  São Caetano do Sul, Brazil
Dates: July 26–28, 2001

|}

|}

Playoff
Venue:  Caracas, Venezuela
Dates: September 1–2, 2001

|}

|}

References

External links
Men's World Championship, Argentina 2002 – Qualifications Tournaments

FIVB Volleyball Men's World Championship
2001 in volleyball
FIVB Volleyball World Championship qualification